Jean-Léonce Dupont (born 31 January 1955) is a French politician and a former member of the French Senate. He represents the Calvados department and is both a Vice President of the Senate and his Union for French Democracy Party. He was mayor of Bayeux between 1995 and 2001.

References
Page on the Senate website (in French)

1955 births
Living people
French Senators of the Fifth Republic
People from Bayeux
Union of Democrats and Independents politicians
The Centrists politicians
Mayors of places in Normandy
Senators of Calvados (department)